Patrick Onwuasor (born August 22, 1992), nicknamed "Peanut", is an American football outside linebacker who is a free agent. He played college football at Portland State and signed with the Baltimore Ravens as an undrafted free agent in 2016.

Professional career

Baltimore Ravens

2016
On May 6, 2016, the Baltimore Ravens signed Onwuasor to a three-year $1.62 million contract as an undrafted free agent. Onwuasor competed for a roster spot as a backup inside linebacker and special teams player against Zach Orr, Brennen Beyer, and Kavell Conner. He began to draw the ire of teammates for his aggressive play and was involved with multiple altercations during training camp. On September 3, 2016, the Baltimore Ravens waived Onwuasor as part of their final roster cuts, but re-signed him to their practice squad the next day. On October 15, 2016, the Baltimore Ravens promoted Onwuasor to their active roster after C.J. Mosley sustained a thigh injury. Upon being added to the active roster, head coach John Harbaugh named Onwuasor the fifth inside linebacker on the Ravens’ depth chart. He was listed behind C.J. Mosley, Zach Orr, Albert McClellan, and Kamalei Correa.

On October 16, 2016, Onwuasor made his professional regular season debut and recorded one solo tackle as the Ravens lost 27–23 at the New York Giants in Week 6. On January 1, 2017, Onwuasor earned his first career start after Zach Orr was placed on injured reserve due to a neck injury he sustained the previous week. He finished the Ravens’ 27–10 loss at the Cincinnati Bengals with a season-high seven combined tackles. Onwuasor completed his rookie season in 2016 with 21 combined tackles (nine solo) in 11 games and one start.

2017
Onwuasor entered training camp in 2017 as a backup linebacker. He began competing against Kamalei Correa for a job as a starting inside linebacker after it was left vacant due to the sudden retirement of Zach Orr. Onwuasor performed well throughout the preseason and solidified himself as a candidate to win the starting inside linebacker role. Head coach John Harbaugh named Onwuasor a backup inside linebacker, behind C.J. Mosley and Kamalei Correa, to begin the regular season.

On September 17, 2017, Onwuasor recorded two combined tackles and made his first career sack as the Ravens defeated the Cleveland Browns 24–10 in Week 2. Onwuasor sacked Browns’ quarterback DeShone Kizer for a one-yard loss in the third quarter. In Week 3, Onwuasor earned his first career start in place of Kamalei Correa and recorded seven combined tackles as the Ravens lost 44–7 at the Jacksonville Jaguars. In Week 5, Onwuasor got the job as a starting inside linebacker after surpassing Kamalei Correa on the depth chart and retained the role for the remainder of the season. On November 19, 2017, he collected a season-high ten combined tackles (eight solo) during a 23–0 win at the Green Bay Packers in Week 11. Onwuasor finished the 2017 NFL season with 90 combined tackles (67 solo), two pass deflections, and one sack in 16 games and 13 starts.

2018
On January 1, 2018, the Baltimore Ravens announced the retirement of defensive coordinator Dean Pees. On January 9, 2018, the Baltimore Ravens announced their decision to promote linebackers coach Don Martindale to defensive coordinator.

On March 14, 2018, the Baltimore Ravens signed Onwuasor to a one-year, $630,000 contract. Onwuasor entered training camp slated as a starting inside linebacker, but received competition from Albert McClellan, Bam Bradley, and Kamalei Correa. Head coach John Harbaugh named Onwuasor a starting inside linebacker to begin the regular season. He began the season alongside outside linebackers Terrell Suggs and Matthew Judon and inside linebacker C. J. Mosley.

On September 23, 2018, Onwuasor recorded three combined tackles, broke up a pass, and made his first career interception during a 27-14 win against the Denver Broncos in Week 3. Onwuasor intercepted a pass by Broncos’ quarterback Case Keenum, that was originally intended for tight end Jeff Heuerman, and returned it for an 89-yard touchdown before it was called back for a penalty in the fourth quarter. The touchdown was called back due to an illegal block above the waist by Matthew Judon. In Week 16, Onwuasor recorded nine combined tackles, two sacks, and forced a fumble on tight end Antonio Gates that was recovered by Tavon Young and returned it for a touchdown in a 22-10 win over the Los Angeles Chargers, earning him AFC Defensive Player of the Week. He finished the season with 59 combined tackles, 5.5 sacks, two forced fumbles, three passes defensed, and an interception.

2019
On March 8, 2019, the Ravens placed a second-round restricted free agent tender on Onwuasor.
In week 9 against the New England Patriots, Onwuasor recorded a team high 8 tackles, sacked Tom Brady once, and forced a fumble on wide receiver Julian Edelman that teammate Marlon Humphrey returned for a 70 yard touchdown in the 37–20 win.

New York Jets
On April 6, 2020, Onwuasor signed a one-year deal with the New York Jets. He was placed on injured reserve on September 7, 2020. He was activated on November 18, 2020. He was placed back on injured reserve on November 28, 2020, after sustaining a hamstring injury in Week 11.

Las Vegas Raiders
On September 6, 2021, Onwuasor was signed to the Las Vegas Raiders practice squad. On November 17, 2021, Onwuasor was promoted to the active roster.

NFL career statistics

References

External links
Baltimore Ravens bio
Portland State Vikings bio

1992 births
Living people
Players of American football from Inglewood, California
American football linebackers
Portland State Vikings football players
Baltimore Ravens players
New York Jets players
Las Vegas Raiders players